Gordon Crooks Wilson (25 February 1872 – 4 May 1937) was a Conservative and Unionist Party member of the House of Commons of Canada. He was born in Dundas, Ontario and became an agent and merchant.

He was the son of John Wilson, was educated in Dundas and entered business there as a hardware merchant. Wilson served as councillor for Dundas, Ontario at one time. He first sought a seat in the Legislative Assembly of Ontario in 1905 but was unsuccessful. He won a provincial seat at Wentworth North in 1908. He quit his provincial seat in 1911 to campaign for federal Parliament.

He was first elected to Parliament at the Wentworth riding in the 1911 general election, then re-elected in 1917, 1921, 1925, 1926 and 1930 federal election. From March 1918 until October 1921, Wilson served under the Unionist Party banner.

References

External links
 
 

1872 births
1937 deaths
Canadian merchants
Conservative Party of Canada (1867–1942) MPs
Hardware merchants
Members of the House of Commons of Canada from Ontario
Ontario municipal councillors
Progressive Conservative Party of Ontario MPPs
Unionist Party (Canada) MPs